Kiamwangi is a settlement in Kenya's Central Province.Kiamwangi is a town located in Murang'a County, Kenya. It is situated at the foot of Mount Kenya and has an elevation of 1,630 m ( 5,347ft). The towns's population was estimated to be 752 in 2019. It has been described as a socio-economic village due to its attribution to numerous social and economic activities

Kiamwamwangi neighbors Ishaweri village, the home of the first and the fourth presidents of Kenya.

References 

It has one big primary school kiamwangi primary school.

Populated places in Central Province (Kenya)